Erik Gustavsson (born 20 February 1956) is a Swedish cross-country skier. He competed in the 50 km event at the 1980 Winter Olympics.

Cross-country skiing results

Olympic Games

References

External links
 

1956 births
Living people
Swedish male cross-country skiers
Olympic cross-country skiers of Sweden
Cross-country skiers at the 1980 Winter Olympics
Cross-country skiers from Dalarna County